Paratheocris similis is a species of beetle in the family Cerambycidae. It was described by Stephan von Breuning in 1938. It is known from the Ivory Coast.

References

Endemic fauna of Ivory Coast
Theocridini
Beetles described in 1938